The Italian Aesculapian snake (Zamenis lineatus) is a species of snake in the Colubridae family.

Geographic range

Z. lineatus is endemic to southern Italy and Sicily. The northern limit of its geographical range is the Province of Caserta in the west and the Province of Foggia in the east. It is absent from the Salentine Peninsula (Salento), which is the "heel" of the "boot" of Italy.

The type locality is Naples.

Description
Dorsally, it is yellowish brown and may have four dark brown stripes. If present, the stripes are of equal width and equidistant. The dorsal scales are smooth. The iris of the eye is red, giving it the common name in Italian of saettone occhirossi (red-eyed racer).

Habitat
The natural habitats of Z. lineatus are temperate forests, temperate shrubland, Mediterranean-type shrubby vegetation, arable land, pastureland, rural gardens, and urban areas.

Diet
The Italian Aesculapian snake feeds on lizards, small mammals, and eggs.

Reproduction
Z. lineatus is oviparous.

Sources

See also
List of reptiles of Italy

References

Further reading
Camerano L (1891). "Monografia degli ofidi italiani. Parte seconda — colubridi e monografia dei cheloni italiani ". Memorie della Reale Accademia delle Scienze di Torino, Serie seconda 41 (2): 403–469. (Callopeltis longissimus Var. lineata, p. 458). (in Italian).
Lenk P, Wüster W (1999). "A Multivariate Approach to the Systematics of Italian Rat Snakes of the Elaphe longissima Complex (Reptilia, Colubridae): Revalidation of Camerano's Callopeltis longissimus var. lineata". The Herpetological Journal 9 (4): 153–162.
Utiger U, Helfenberger N, Schätti B, Schmidt C, Ruf M, Ziswiler V (2002). "Molecular systematics and phylogeny of Old World and New World ratsnakes, Elaphe Auct., and related genera (Reptilia, Squamata, Colubridae)". Russian Journal of Herpetology 9 (2): 105–124.

Zamenis
Reptiles of Europe
Endemic fauna of Italy
Reptiles described in 1891
Taxa named by Lorenzo Camerano
Taxonomy articles created by Polbot